Mount Töpfer is a mountain  with an elevation of 582 metres near the municipality of Oybin in the German state of Saxony. It is situated in the Zittau Mountains which are part of the Lusatian Mountains. It is known for it interesting rock formations near the top. Its name Töpfer (English: Potter) was probably derived from the peak that resembles two chalices.

Rock Formations and Sights 

 Parrot (Papagei)
 Turtle (Schildkröte)
 Chick (Küken)
 Wobble Stone (Wackelstein)
 Broody Hen (Brütende Henne)
 European Summit Cross (Europakreuz)
 The Cave of Gratz (Gratzer Höhle)

Mountains of Saxony